Methoxypsoralen may refer to:

 5-Methoxypsoralen (bergapten)
 8-Methoxypsoralen (methoxsalen)